James T. Clancy (1833–December 1870) was a Sergeant in the Union Army during the American Civil War who was awarded the Medal of Honor for his actions during the Battle of Vaughan Road.

Biography
Clancy joined the 1st New Jersey Cavalry in October 1863. He distinguished himself on October 1, 1864 at the Battle of Vaughan Road. He served with C Company of the 1st New Jersey Cavalry, and is credited with firing the shot that killed Confederate Brigadier General John Dunovant. Dunovant was leading a Confederate cavalry charge against the front of a fortified Union position where Union cavalry under the command of Brigadier General Henry E. Davies were fighting dismounted. Dunovant's death was one of the key factors leading to a Union victory in the engagement as it disconcerted his brigade and led to a delay in further attacks. This gave Davies time to move his men to an even stronger fortified position. President Andrew Johnson awarded the Medal of Honor to Sergeant Clancy on July 3, 1865.

Following this action, Clancy was commissioned as an officer in September 1864, and mustered out with his regiment in July 1865. He died in December 1870 in Remedios, Cuba while working on U.S. civilian military aid to Cuba during the Ten Years' War (1868–1878) against Spain, the first Cuban War of Independence. His burial place is currently unknown.

Notes

References
 Sommers, Richard J. Richmond Redeemed: The Siege at Petersburg. Garden City, NY: Doubleday, 1981. .
 'Military Times Medal Citations'

1833 births
1870 deaths
United States Army Medal of Honor recipients
Union Army soldiers
Missing middle or first names
American Civil War recipients of the Medal of Honor
Military personnel from Albany, New York
American expatriates in Cuba